Nukespeak: Nuclear Language, Visions and Mindset is a 1982 book by Stephen Hilgartner, Richard C. Bell and Rory O'Connor. This book is a concise history of nuclear weapons and nuclear power in the United States, with special emphasis on the language of the "nuclear mindset".

The National Council of Teachers of English gave the book's authors an Orwell Award in 1982.

See also
List of books about nuclear issues
Nuclear and radiation accidents

References
 

Nuclear energy in the United States
1982 books
Books about nuclear issues